Nottingham North West was a borough constituency in the city of Nottingham.  It returned one Member of Parliament (MP)  to the House of Commons of the Parliament of the United Kingdom.

History
The constituency was created for the 1950 general election, although in reality this was merely a renaming of the previous Nottingham West seat. It disappeared at the 1955 general election, when its territory was split between the redrawn Nottingham West constituency (Broxtowe and Wollaton wards) and the new Nottingham North constituency (St Albans ward).

Boundaries
The County Borough of Nottingham wards of Broxtowe, St Albans, and Wollaton.

Members of Parliament

Election result

References 

Parliamentary constituencies in Nottinghamshire (historic)
Constituencies of the Parliament of the United Kingdom established in 1950
Constituencies of the Parliament of the United Kingdom disestablished in 1955